Shanghai Airport may refer to:

 Shanghai Hongqiao International Airport, which primarily serves destinations within China
 Shanghai Pudong International Airport, which primarily serves international destinations
 Shanghai Longhua Airport, a former airport in use from 1922 to 2008
 Shanghai Jiangwan Airport, a former airport in use from 1945 to 1994

zh:上海机场